Jacques Vandier (1 April 1927 – 30 March 2020) was a French entrepreneur. He strongly promoted mutualism in France, and was nicknamed the "pope of mutualism". He directed MACIF for 37 years, and served as a member of the French Economic, Social and Environmental Council from 1989 to 1994 and was a Regional Councillor for Poitou-Charentes from 1992 to 1998.

Distinctions
Knight of the Legion of Honour
Commander of the Ordre national du Mérite

References

1927 births
2020 deaths
People from Niort
French businesspeople
Recipients of the Legion of Honour